Piero Antonio Bonnet (Comacchio, 2 August 1940 – Rome, 18 February 2018) was an Italian jurist and the iudex unicus of the Vatican City State.

Biography

From 1947 to 1953, he studied at the Nobile Collegio Mondragone run by the Jesuits in Frascati.

After teaching the Faculty of Jurisprudence at the University of Modena, he took up important tasks at the University of Teramo where he was president of the Faculty of Jurisprudence, prorector, and director of the school of specialization for the juridical disciplines, director of the department of juridical sciences in society and in history, and a member of the academic senate. He also taught at the Pontifical Lateran University and the Pontifical Gregorian University.

On 20 May 2009 he was appointed by Pope Benedict XVI as the iudex unicus of the Vatican City State, replacing the deceased Gianluigi Marrone.

References

External links
 Curriculum Vitae

1940 births
2018 deaths
Italian jurists
20th-century jurists
21st-century jurists
Academic staff of the University of Modena and Reggio Emilia
Academic staff of the University of Teramo
Academic staff of the Pontifical Lateran University
Academic staff of the Pontifical Gregorian University
21st-century Italian judges
People from Comacchio